Peperomia wolfgang-krahnii is a succulent species of plant endemic to the country of Peru.   It has grey-green leaves that can have 5 inches of the shrub. Leaves alternate from the top being grey-greened and warty, while the bottom is folded with smooth and shiny leaves.

References

wolfgang-krahnii
Flora of South America
Flora of Peru